McGroarty is a surname. Notable people with the surname include:

Chris McGroarty (born 1981), Scottish footballer
Jimmy McGroarty (born 1957), Northern Irish footballer
John S. McGroarty (1862–1944), American poet and politician
Rutger McGroarty (born 2004), American ice hockey player
Stephen Joseph McGroarty (1830–1870), Irish American soldier
Tom McGroarty, American politician